Beacon Food Forest is a 7-acre food forest in development adjacent to Jefferson Park on Beacon Hill in Seattle, Washington in the vicinity of 15th Avenue South and South Dakota Street. As the area sits on land owned by Seattle Public Utilities, it is believed to be the largest food forest on public land in the United States.
 The project also has more traditional private allotments, similar to those in other local P-Patch gardens.

Background

In 2009, an early version of the project, then known as Jefferson Park Food Forest, was presented at OmCulture in Wallingford, Seattle by a design team of four students as a Permaculture Design Course (PDC) final project. The initiative was led by Jacqueline Cramer, a Seattle landscape designer and activist, and Glenn Herlihy, a member of the Jefferson Park Alliance, who was already involved in the community design and outreach process involved with the $8 million Pro-Parks Levy for the reconstruction of Jefferson Park. 

That course was primarily taught by Marisha Auerbach, Kelda Miller and Jenny Pell with several prominent guest speakers from the local permaculture and raw vegan community. Classes were held at the Raw Vegan Source/New Earth Permaculture Farm in Redmond, at Seattle Tilth at the Home of the Good Shepherd as well as other workshop locations in 2009. Shortly thereafter, the project gained support by the Jefferson Park Alliance and moved toward its planning and development phase.

Heidi Cramer, and Daniel Lorenz Johnson, were also members of the original PDC class design team, A new group, named Friends of Beacon Food Forest, emerged in 2011 during the public outreach phase of the project.

Government process
In 2010, a $20,000 City of Seattle Department of Neighborhoods Small and Simple Neighborhood Matching Fund (NMF) grant was provided to hire a design team to come up with a design based on input from three public design workshops. 

In December 2011 the project received $100,000 from the Department of Neighborhoods to begin phase one of the food forest plan.

Outreach
The group began an extensive outreach campaign to garner support from the community and the City of Seattle. The effort was relatively successful, garnering significant responses from local permaculturalists as well as others involved in community gardener and ecologically conscious groups.

Publicity
The project was covered by the Associated Press, National Public Radio and had a significant place in the monologue of The Late Late Show with Craig Ferguson, who joked that "in downtown LA they are talking about building a forest like this one in Seattle but instead of looking for berries its kinda like a petting zoo, you get to hand feed Kardashians".

Notes

References

External links

Beacon Food Forest
Beacon Food Forest site 
Seattle Department of Neighborhoods: P-Patch Community Gardens: Beacon Food Forest
Beacon Food Forest Schematic Site Plan
Seattle Parks and Recreation: Beacon Food Forest Project Information
Facebook: Beacon Food Forest Page
Beacon Food Forest on Vimeo

Neighborhood

Jefferson Park
Jefferson Park Alliance - neighborhood advocates for the park
Jefferson Park Community Center

Collaborative partners
Margarett Harrison (see her Beacon Food Forest project page) and Jenny Pell
Seattle Department of Neighborhoods
Seattle Permaculture Guild

Agriculture in Washington (state)
Agroforestry
American food and drink organizations
Beacon Hill, Seattle
Community gardening in Washington (state)
Parks in Seattle
Permaculture organizations
Tourist attractions in Seattle
Urban agriculture
Urban forestry
Urban forests in the United States